Abdullapur is a settlement situated in the eastern outskirts of Meerut, just to the south of Ganga Nagar, Meerut district, Uttar Pradesh, India.

It is also known as Abdullapur Sadaat. It was founded by Syed Mir Abdullah Naqvi Al Bukhari. Kot Kila or Kot Fort of Abdullapur was built in the early 16th century, it was his main residence. Abdullapur is the seat of the Jalal Bukhari and Kannauji Bukhari branch of Naqvi.
 
Both are descendants of Jalaluddin Surkh-Posh Bukhari through Syed Ali Naqvi, Syed Sadarudin Shah Kabir Naqvi Al Bukhari the chief advisor of Sikandar Lodi and father of Syed Mehboob Alam Naqvi-ul Bukhari Al-Maroof Shah Jewna.Shah Jewna’s colonized towns in Kannauj:- Siray- e-Miraan, Bibiyaan Jalalpur, Makhdoom Pur, Laal Pur (associated with the name of Saint Sayyed Jalaluddin Haider Surkh Posh Bukhari or Laal Bukhari). Makhdoom Jahaniya Mosque is also present in Kannauj.

9th Moharram of this town is quite famous. Notable sites include Bada Darwaza (main entrance of Kot Fort), Syed Asgar Hussain's Imambara, Shakir Mahal, 52 Dari, Kot Masjid, Azmat Manzil, Sayyed Tomb, Syed Barkat Ali Naqvi's 300 years old Pakki Baithak, Prachin Shiv Mandir.

Sayyeds of this place are popularly known as "Mirsahibs". They had a large Jagirdara consisting of 52 villages. The lavish lifestyle of Syed Bunyad Ali Naqvi and Syed Badshah Ali Naqvi was noteworthy. There are numerous wafq frauds cases going on including Vijay Mallya's liquor factory on waqf land.

The district jail in Meerut is located at Abdullapur.   This jail has an illustrious history attached to it as its establishment dates back to as early as 1857, It is also called Shri Chaudhry Charan Singh Jail, named after the 5th Prime Minister of India.

The Pakistani writer, linguist and critic Syed Qudrat Naqvi was a denizen of Abdullapur, his famous books are Ghalib kaun hai, Asaas-i-Urdu, Ghalib-i-sad rang, Seerat-un-Nabi, Hindi-Urdu lughat, Mutal'a-i-Abdul Haq, Lisani maqalaat. He migrated to Pakistan after the partition of India.

Gallery

References

Further sources
 Delimitation of Parliamentary and Assembly Constituencies Order, 1976, p. 561. Election Commission, India, 1976
 Directory of Cities and Towns in India (ed. Om Parkash Sharma, Dy. Dir. of Census Operations). Kar Kripa Publishers, 1989
 Uttar Pradesh District Gazetteers: Meerut (text & suppl.), p. 469. Government of Uttar Pradesh, 1965

External links
Meerut Development Authority: approved colonies in Abdullapur
 

Wikipedia
Content is available under CC BY-SA 3.0 unless otherwise noted.
Privacy policyTerms of UseDesktop

Villages in Meerut district